Knocked Out Loaded is the 24th studio album by American singer-songwriter Bob Dylan, released on July 14, 1986 by Columbia Records.

The album was received poorly upon release, and is still considered by some critics to be one of Dylan's least-engaging efforts. However, the 11-minute epic "Brownsville Girl", co-written by Sam Shepard, has been cited as one of his best songs by some critics.

Composition
The album includes three cover songs, three collaborations with other songwriters and two solo compositions by Dylan. Most of the album was recorded in the spring of 1986, although recording or mixing work on one track, "Got My Mind Made Up", reportedly occurred in June.  Several tracks from the album used overdubbing to build on instrumental tracks from 1984 and 1985 sessions.

One song, "Maybe Someday", paraphrases a line from T. S. Eliot's poem Journey of the Magi: Eliot's "And the cities hostile and the towns unfriendly" becomes in Dylan "Through hostile cities and unfriendly towns".

Cover art

The cover art is a reworking of the January 1939 cover of Spicy Adventure Stories.

Reception
The album earned mostly negative reactions, with only a rewritten version of an outtake ("New Danville Girl'", retitled "Brownsville Girl") recorded during the Empire Burlesque sessions, receiving uniform praise. Robert Christgau called it "one of the greatest and most ridiculous of [Dylan's] great ridiculous epics."

"Knocked Out Loaded is ultimately a depressing affair," wrote Anthony DeCurtis in his review published in Rolling Stone magazine, "because its slipshod, patchwork nature suggests that Dylan released this LP not because he had anything in particular to say, but to cash in on his 1986 tour. Even worse, it suggests Dylan's utter lack of artistic direction." In the Howard Sounes book Down the Highway: The Life of Bob Dylan, it is reported that Dylan said "if the records I'm making only sell a certain amount anyway, then why should I take so long putting them together?"

Dylan has played few songs from this album in concert; "Driftin' Too Far from Shore", with 14 performances (all but one in 1988), is the most frequently performed. Four songs remain unplayed, while the other three have together been aired only five times.

In recent years the album has gained a cult following among some Dylan fans who believe it is one of his least-understood works, but critical consensus remains negative, with recent reviews from Salon.com to Rolling Stone calling it a "career-killer" and "the absolute bottom of the Dylan barrel" respectively.

The album was remastered and re-issued in 2013 as a part of The Complete Albums Collection, Vol. One box set.

Track listing

Personnel
 Bob Dylan – guitar, harmonica, keyboards, vocals, production
 Peggi Blu – background vocals
 Majason Bracey – background vocals
 Clem Burke, Anton Fig, Mike Berment, Milton Gabriel, Don Heffington, Bryan Parris, Stan Lynch, Raymond Lee Pounds – drums
 T Bone Burnett, Tom Petty, Ira Ingber, Mike Campbell, Jack Sherman, David A. Stewart, Ronnie Wood – guitar
 Carolyn Dennis – background vocals
 Steve Douglas – saxophone
 Howie Epstein, James Jamerson, Jr., John McKenzie, Vito Sanfilippo, Carl Sealove, Jon Paris – bass guitar
 Lara Firestone – background vocals
 Keysha Gwin – background vocals
 Muffy Hendrix – background vocals
 April Hendrix-Haberlan – background vocals
 Dewey B. Jones II – background vocals
 Phil Jones – congas
 Al Kooper, Vince Melamed, Patrick Seymour, Benmont Tench – keyboards
 Steve Madaio – trumpet
 Queen Esther Marrow – background vocals
 Larry Mayhand – background vocals
 Larry Meyers – mandolin
 Angel Newell – background vocals
 Herbert Newell – background vocals
 Al Perkins – steel guitar
 Crystal Pounds – background vocals
 Madelyn Quebec – background vocals
 Pamela Quinlan - background vocals
 Daina Smith – background vocals
 Maia Smith – vocals
 Medena Smith – background vocals
 Annette May Thomas – background vocals
 Damien Turnbough – background vocals
 Chyna Wright – background vocals
 Elesecia Wright – background vocals
 Tiffany Wright – background vocals

Production
 Britt Bacon – engineering
 Judy Feltus – engineering
 Greg Fulginiti – mastering
 Don Smith – engineering
 George Tutko – engineering

Notes

External links
Bob Dylan Biography, biography.com

1986 albums
Albums produced by Bob Dylan
Bob Dylan albums
Columbia Records albums